Sundargarh District is a district in the northwestern part of Odisha state in eastern India.

Sundargarh district is bounded by Raigarh district of Chhattisgarh in the west, Jashpur district of Chhattisgarh in the North-West, Simdega district of Jharkhand in the North, West Singhbhum district of Jharkhand and Keonjhar district of Odisha in the east and Jharsuguda, Sambalpur, Deogarh and Angul districts of Odisha in the South. The town of Sundargarh is the district headquarters. Rourkela is the largest city in the entire district.

Geography
The Sundargarh district forms the northwestern part of the Odisha state and is the second largest district in the state accounting for 6.23% of the total area. The district spreads from 21°36′N to 22°32′N and from 83°32′E to 85°22′E.

Demographics

According to the 2011 census Sundargarh district has a population of 2,093,437, roughly equal to the nation of North Macedonia or the US state of New Mexico. This gives it a ranking of 221st in India (out of a total of 640). Its population growth rate over the decade 2001–2011 was 13.66%. Sundargarh has a sex ratio of 973 females for every 1000 males, and a literacy rate of 73.34%.

At the time of the 2011 Census of India, 45.89% of the population in the district spoke Odia, 14.8% Sadri, 9.62% Mundari, 6.98% Hindi, 5.57% Kurukh, 4.57% Kisan, 4.38% Kharia, 2.14% Urdu and 1.52% Bengali as their first language.

Economy
In 2006 the Ministry of Panchayati Raj named Sundargarh one of the country's 250 most backward districts (out of a total of 640). It is one of the 19 districts in Odisha currently receiving funds from the Backward Regions Grant Fund Programme (BRGF).

Politics

Lok Sabha 

Present Lok Sabha MP is Jual Oram who is representing the seat from 2014.

Vidhan Sabha Constituencies

The following is the list of 7 Vidhan Sabha constituencies of Sundargarh district and the elected members of that area

References

External links
 wikimapia coord
 

 
1948 establishments in India
Districts of Odisha